Lance Howard, better known by his stage name Lance Skiiiwalker, is an American singer, rapper and record producer from Chicago, Illinois. He is signed to Top Dawg Entertainment and his debut album, Introverted Intuition, was released in October 2016.

Musical career
In 2007, Lance met Darius "D-Win" Windfield and the two formed "The Rocketeers" in which several projects were released under their independent label Rocketeer Music.

In 2014, Lance Skiiiwalker appeared on Schoolboy Q's Oxymoron on the track "His & Her Fiend" along with SZA. In 2015, he then was featured on Jay Rock's 90059 on three tracks, "Money Trees Deuce", "90059", and "Telegram". In 2016, he was also featured on Kendrick Lamar's untitled unmastered. for the song "untitled 04".

On May 20, 2016, it was announced that Lance Skiiiwalker signed to Top Dawg Entertainment, with his debut album, Introverted Intuition, set for a release later in 2016. Celebrating the announcement, he released his single "Speed". On May 27, he released the second single, "Could It Be", with an accompanied music video.

On August 18, 2017, Skiiiwalker released a single entitled, "Where To With You", with a music video he produced which accompanied it. Both the video and single were later removed from all platforms without specified reasons. Om February 9, 2023, both the song and video were reinstated to accompany the release of his 2nd studio album, Audiodidactic.

Discography

Studio albums

EPs

Remix albums

Singles

As featured artist

Guest appearances

Production discography

2014 
 ScHoolboy Q – Oxymoron
 13. "His & Her Fiend" (featuring SZA)

2016 
 Lance Skiiiwalker – Introverted Intuition
 1. "Forbidden Fruit" (produced with Sounwave and DJ Dahi)
 2. "((Ni)) Radio" (produced with O'bonjour)
 4. "Speed" 
 5. "Stockholm" (featuring Michael Anthony) (produced with THEMpeople, J. LBS. & Dave Free)
 8. "Skit / Her Song" (produced with Tae Beast, Frank Dukes & Ben Shepherd)
 9. "Attraction" (produced with Carter Lang and Peter CottonTale) 
 11. "Advantage" (produced with J. LBS & O'bonjour)

2021

 Lance Skiiiwalker – Tales From the Telescope Chapter 1: Rebirth

 5. "Sometimes"

 Lance Skiiiwalker – Tales From The Telescope Chapter 2: Internal Shine

 3. "Chicago"

 5. "I Woke Up"

2023

 Lance Skiiiwalker – Audiodidactic

 1. "Friends" (produced with Groove & Amaire Johnson)

 3. "Church" (featuring Ab-Soul)

 4. "IG"

 6. "Sample Talk" (featuring Isaiah Rashad) (produced with Amaire Johnson) 

 7. "I Just Want" (produced with Amaire Johnson)

 8. "It was all" (featuring V.C.R (USA)) (produced with Benjamin Burdon)

 9. "Beantown" (produced with Henry Was)

 10. "Audiodidactic" (produced with Amaire Johnson & Byron The Aquarius)

 11. (NI) Radio Whispers (produced with Amaire Johnson & Byron The Aquarius)

References

Living people
Rappers from Chicago
Midwest hip hop musicians
American hip hop singers
Top Dawg Entertainment artists
21st-century American rappers
Year of birth missing (living people)
Alternative R&B musicians